KEM Electric Cooperative is a public utility cooperative based in Linton, North Dakota, United States.  It serves as the electric distribution utility in a portion of south central North Dakota.  KEM Electric is a member of and receives its electricity from Basin Electric Power Cooperative. It also is a member of Touchstone Energy. KEM Electric has 7 board members, including 2 At Large members and 1 for each of its 5 districts.

References

External links
KEM Electric Cooperative site

Electric cooperatives in North Dakota
Electric power companies of the United States